Passione fatale is a 1950 Italian film directed by Ernesto Grassi.

Cast
Jone Paoli
Aldo De Franchi
Mara Landi
Agostino Salvietti
Vittoria Crispo

External links
 

1950 films
1950s Italian-language films
1950s romance films
Italian romance films
1950s Italian films